Luke James Foster (born 8 September 1985) was an English professional footballer who last played as a defender for Northern Premier League Division One East club Loughborough Dynamo.

Foster started his career as a trainee with Sheffield Wednesday, signing a professional contract with the club at the age of 18. He joined Scarborough on work experience in September 2004, and was also loaned out to Conference North club Alfreton Town in February 2005 until the end of the 2004–05 season. On returning to his parent club, Foster was released, and joined Lincoln City in June 2005. He was loaned out to York City the following season on a two-month loan. In January 2007, Foster was released by Lincoln, and he joined Stalybridge Celtic on a short-term contract. He left Stalybridge a month later, in order to join Oxford United on an initial six-month deal. Foster went on to play over 100 times for Oxford in just under three years at the club, winning two end of season awards in the process.

In January 2010 Foster signed for Mansfield Town, where he spent just five months. He then joined Stevenage on a two-year contract in May 2010, helping the club earn promotion to League One in their first ever season in the Football League. After just one season at Stevenage, Foster joined Rotherham United in June 2011, spending an injury-hit season with the club before being released. He briefly spent time at Matlock Town, before joining Preston North End in December 2012 for a six-month period. Foster returned to Lincoln City during the 2013–14 season, before spending two years as club captain at Conference Premier side Southport. He left Southport in February 2016 and signed for Harrogate Town for the remainder of the campaign. A brief stint as player-coach at Ilkeston followed as Foster moved into part-time football, also playing for Northern Premier League clubs Coalville Town, Brighouse Town, Goole, Barwell and Loughborough Dynamo respectively.

Early life
Foster grew up in South Yorkshire and attended Wombwell High School.

Club career

Early career
Foster began his career as a trainee in the Sheffield Wednesday youth academy. He joined Conference National club Scarborough on work experience in September 2004. Foster made his debut for Scarborough in a 1–0 defeat to Hereford United, coming on as a 76th minute substitute. He started the following match in the club's 2–1 loss at Carlisle United, and went on to make 10 appearances during the loan agreement. Foster returned to his parent club, but failed to make any first-team appearances, and was subsequently loaned out to Conference North club Alfreton Town in February 2005 until the end of the season. He made his Alfreton debut in the club's 3–0 victory against Woking in the FA Trophy. He scored his first goal for the club in a 3–1 defeat against Southport. Foster played his last game for the club in the final game of the 2004–05 season, a 3–1 loss at Stafford Rangers. He played in 19 games for the club during the loan spell, scoring three goals.

On his return to Sheffield Wednesday in May 2005, Foster was released and later joined League Two club Lincoln City on a one-year contract ahead of the 2005–06 season. Foster made his debut for Lincoln in the club's first game of the season, a 2–1 defeat to Notts County. He played sporadically throughout the campaign, and made 17 appearances, scoring once in a 5–0 win against Grimsby Town on 25 March 2006. Despite playing a peripheral role during the campaign, Foster signed a one-year contract extension at the end of the season. However, Foster did not play again for Lincoln during the 2006–07 campaign and, after training with York City, he joined the Conference National club on a one-month emergency loan on 5 October 2006 due to injuries to defenders. He made his debut for the club in a 1–0 win against Aldershot Town. This loan deal was extended for a second month on 3 November 2006, but after Foster suffered an ankle injury during the last week of the loan, he returned to his parent club on 4 December 2006. He made his last appearance for York in the club's 1–0 defeat to League One team Bristol City in the FA Cup first round. He made seven appearances for York during a two-month loan spell with the club.

Foster returned to Lincoln in December, and a month later was told by the club that he was free to find another club after being told he was not part of the club's first-team plans. He subsequently mutually agreed to cancel his contract with Lincoln in January 2007, enabling him to join Conference North club Stalybridge Celtic on a free transfer. He made his debut for Stalybridge in the FA Trophy, starting in a 1–1 draw against Kettering Town, scoring an own goal just before half-time. He scored his first goal for the club against one of his former employers, Alfreton, scoring the winning goal in a 2–1 victory. He made six appearances for the club in all competitions, scoring once.

Oxford United
After just a month at Stalybridge, Foster returned to the highest tier in non-League football, joining Conference National club Oxford United on 16 February 2007. He made his Oxford debut two weeks after signing for the club, starting in a 1–0 home defeat to Kidderminster Harriers. He played nine times during the club's 2006–07 campaign, scoring once in a 2–0 win over St Albans City at Clarence Park. At the end of the season, he signed a new one-year contract with Oxford, keeping him contracted to the club throughout the 2007–08 season. After playing just three times in the opening two months of the season, Oxford manager Jim Smith stated that Foster needed to "improve the way he leads his life" in order to "stand a chance" of getting back into the Oxford first-team. After this, Foster played regularly until the end of the season, although he was given a one match suspension following his sending off against Northwich Victoria in March 2008. At the end of the 2007–08 season, in which he made 39 appearances, he won Oxford's Supporters Player of the Year and Players' Player of the Year awards. As a result of his form, he signed a new two-year contract with the club on 29 July 2008.

During the 2008–09 season, Foster continued to play regularly at centre-back for Oxford,. In Oxford's match against Wrexham on 21 August 2008, Foster was sent off after just 11 minutes for "denying Wrexham's Shaun Whalley a clear goalscoring opportunity". As a result, he missed the next two games, returning to the first-team against Ebbsfleet United on 30 August 2008, but was once again sent off, this time for a foul on Craig Stone. Consequently, Foster did not play again in the first-team for a month. He regained his place in Oxford's defence, and played regularly until the end of the season. He scored his only goal of the season in a 2–1 victory over Lewes in February 2009. Foster made 44 appearances for the club during the season, scoring one goal, as Oxford narrowly missed out on a place in the Conference Premier play-offs. The following campaign, Foster was again a regular under manager Chris Wilder, appearing in all of Oxford's games up until December 2009. He scored his first goal of the season in Oxford's 1–1 draw against Barrow on 3 October 2009. Foster was sent off in a 1–1 draw against Barrow in the FA Cup on 28 November 2009, resulting in Barrow being awarded a penalty kick and subsequently scoring. In January 2010, Wilder stated that Oxford would not be extending Foster's contract in the summer, with Foster "wanting that option to pursue offers from other clubs".

Mansfield Town
He subsequently entered talks with Cambridge United in January 2010, although no transfer materialised. Mansfield Town also enquired about signing Foster, although they initially decided against making a transfer bid, citing Foster's "high wages as the main stumbling block". However, a week later, Mansfield signed Foster on a one-and-a-half-year contract for an undisclosed fee and he was instantly appointed the club captain. He made his debut in Mansfield's 4–1 victory over Forest Green Rovers on 30 January 2010. Foster was sent off in a 1–0 defeat to York on 16 March 2010, which resulted in him receiving a two-match suspension. He made 16 appearances for Mansfield during the second half of the 2009–10 season. At the end of the season, Foster made a comment on his Facebook page, calling the club a "shambles", but later apologised to both the club and its fans. He was released in May 2010, with Mansfield boss David Holdsworth saying "it's a practical decision for both the club and Luke".

Stevenage
Foster joined newly promoted League Two club Stevenage on a two-year contract on 31 May 2010. Foster made his Stevenage debut in the club's first Football League fixture, a 2–2 draw against Macclesfield Town, playing the whole game in the centre of defence. After the Macclesfield game, Foster did not play in the first-team until late September 2010, coming on as a late substitute in Stevenage's 1–0 away win at Lincoln City. He then appeared as a 52nd-minute substitute in the club's victory over Burton Albion, but was sent-off for a foul on Shaun Harrad. Foster scored his first goal for Stevenage on 3 January 2011, scoring the first goal of the game in Stevenage's 4–2 home win over Barnet. Foster received his second red card of the 2010–11 season in a game against Northampton Town, for a foul on Seth Nana Twumasi, a game that Stevenage went on to lose 2–0. Stevenage appealed against the sending off, but the appeal was subsequently rejected. This ultimately meant that Foster had played his last game of the 2010–11 season, serving a four-match suspension that ruled him out of Stevenage's end of season 3–3 draw with Bury, as well as the club's subsequent play-off campaign. Foster played 23 times for Stevenage in his only season with the club, scoring once, and the team went on to win promotion into League One via the play-offs.

Rotherham United
Foster signed for League Two club Rotherham United on 20 June 2011. He signed a one-year contract with the club, with an option of a second year. Foster made his debut for the club in a 3–0 home victory against Gillingham on 27 August 2011, coming on as an 84th-minute substitute with Rotherham already holding a three-goal advantage. After making no further first-team appearances the following month, Foster was made available for loan by manager Andy Scott. Scott stated Foster lacked both desire and fitness since signing for the club. However, no loan transfer materialised, and Foster made his second appearance for Rotherham in a 3–3 away draw at Morecambe on 25 October 2011. He subsequently made his first start in a 2–0 home victory over Aldershot Town on 5 November 2011, Rotherham's first win in 10 matches. In December 2011, Rotherham manager Andy Scott revealed that Foster would miss the rest of the 2011–12 season as a result of a cruciate ligament damage sustained in a match against Hereford United on 10 December 2011. He was released by Rotherham in May 2012, having made six appearances for the club.

Matlock Town
Ahead of the 2012–13 season, Foster went on trial with League One club Sheffield United. He played in the club's opening pre-season fixture, coming on as a 62nd-minute substitute in a 1–1 draw with Ilkeston. No move materialised, and Foster signed non-contract terms with Northern Premier League Premier Division team Matlock Town to build match fitness ahead of a return to the professional game. He made his Matlock debut just a day after signing, on 18 August 2012, playing the whole match as Matlock opened the season with a 5–0 home defeat to Nantwich Town. Foster made ten appearances in all competitions for the club, leaving in October 2012.

Preston North End
After a month without a club, Foster went on trial at League One club Preston North End in November 2012, managed by former Stevenage manager Graham Westley. The trial proved successful, and he signed on non-contract terms with the club on 18 December 2012. He made his debut on the same day in a 3–3 draw against Bury in the Football League Trophy, with Preston progressing following a penalty shoot-out. After impressing Westley in his first four matches for the club, Foster signed a permanent contract, keeping him at Preston for the remainder of the 2012–13 season. In the club's next match, on 10 January 2013, a televised 3–2 defeat to Coventry City at the Ricoh Arena in the Football League Trophy, Foster scored his only goal for Preston, briefly restoring parity in the match as Coventry scored two injury-time goals to win the match. Foster made eight appearances in all competitions during his time with the club, and at the end of the season, new Preston manager Simon Grayson told him that his contract would not be renewed when it expired in June 2013.

Return to Non-League
Foster rejoined Conference Premier club Lincoln City on 1 August 2013, signing a one-year deal with the club he had previously played for from 2005 to 2007. He made his second debut for the club ten days after signing, on the opening day of the 2013–14 season, playing the whole match in central defence as Lincoln drew 0–0 away at Woking. Both of Foster's goals for the season came in away fixtures at Braintree Town. The first was scored in an FA Trophy match on 14 December 2013, netting in the 91st minute to give Lincoln the lead in an eventual 3–1 win. His second came in the same fixture, but in the league, three months later; courtesy of a header from a Sean Newton corner in a 2–0 away victory on 18 March 2014. He played regularly throughout the campaign, making 37 appearances in a season where Lincoln struggled for consistency and finished 14th in Conference Premier. Foster left Lincoln when his contract expired at the end of the season.

Shortly after becoming a free agent, Foster signed for another Conference Premier team in the form of Southport on 18 June 2014. He was made club captain ahead of the 2014–15 season. Foster made his debut for Southport in a 1–0 home defeat to Forest Green Rovers on the first day of the season. He scored his first goal for the club in his fourth appearance; his stoppage-time header gave Southport their first win of the season in a 2–1 victory over Altrincham at Haig Avenue on 23 August 2014. Foster made 41 appearances during the campaign in all competitions and scored four times. He was named the club's Player of the Year for the season. He remained at Southport for the 2015–16 campaign and was ever-present during the first half of the campaign. However, Foster started to struggle with the commute to Southport from his home in Barnsley each day and subsequently joined local National League North club Harrogate Town on 24 February 2016, on a contract until the remainder of the season. He made just four appearances during his time at Harrogate, spending the majority of his time there as an unused substitute, and left when his contract expired in April 2016.

Foster subsequently signed for Ilkeston in May 2016, joining the club as a player-coach; the first coaching role of his career. He featured frequently during the opening months of the season, but suffered an injury in an FA Trophy defeat to Barwell in October 2016. It proved to be Foster's last appearance for the club as he left Ilkeston by mutual consent and signed for Northern Premier League club Coalville Town on 30 November 2016. He spent five months at Coalville, leaving the club in April 2017 after being appointed as Oldham Athletic's new commercial manager on 28 March 2017.

Foster returned to playing when he joined National League North club North Ferriby United in August 2017. After making no appearances for North Ferriby during the opening month of the season, he signed for Brighouse Town of the Northern Premier League Division One North in September 2017, making one appearance. He then joined divisional rivals Goole later that month. He made his debut for Goole in a 2–1 loss at Trafford on 16 September 2017, and went on to make five appearances in all competitions during a one-month spell for the club. He moved up a division, signing for Northern Premier League club Barwell in November 2017. He played twice for  Barwell, before briefly re-joining North Ferriby United in December 2017. Having initially been linked with a move to Loughborough Dynamo in February 2018, Foster eventually signed for the Northern Premier League Division One East club on 14 July 2018.

International career
Foster was named on standby for the England C team in November 2007 for a match against Finland C, but did not receive a call-up. He was called up again to represent England C against Bosnia and Herzegovina in Sarajevo in September 2008. Foster played the whole match as England C lost 6–2 to Bosnia, assisting Luke Moore's goal. This was his only appearance for England C.

Personal life
Foster has described himself as a "family man", but admits to making bad lifestyle choices in his "younger years". He was in a relationship for six years with Rebekah Nicholson, who later married Jamie Vardy. They have one son, born in January 2010.

Career statistics

Honours
Stevenage
 League Two play-offs: 2010–11

Individual
 Oxford United Player of the Year: 2007–08
 Southport Player of the Year: 2014–15

References

External links

1985 births
Living people
People from Mexborough
Footballers from South Yorkshire
English footballers
England semi-pro international footballers
Association football defenders
Sheffield Wednesday F.C. players
Scarborough F.C. players
Alfreton Town F.C. players
Lincoln City F.C. players
York City F.C. players
Stalybridge Celtic F.C. players
Oxford United F.C. players
Mansfield Town F.C. players
Stevenage F.C. players
Rotherham United F.C. players
Matlock Town F.C. players
Preston North End F.C. players
Southport F.C. players
Harrogate Town A.F.C. players
Ilkeston F.C. players
Coalville Town F.C. players
North Ferriby United A.F.C. players
Brighouse Town F.C. players
Goole A.F.C. players
Barwell F.C. players
Loughborough Dynamo F.C. players
National League (English football) players
English Football League players
Northern Premier League players